This is a list of supermarket chains in Italy.

List of current Italian supermarket chains

References

Supermarket
Italy